Faraman (also Romanized as Farāmān) is a village in Dorudfaraman Rural District, in the Central District of Kermanshah County, Kermanshah Province, Iran. At the 2006 census, its population was 223, in 46 families.

References 

Populated places in Kermanshah County